Elmer Cable "Red" Durrett (February 3, 1921 – January 17, 1992) was an American outfielder in Major League Baseball who played for the Brooklyn Dodgers during the 1944 and 1945 seasons. Born in Sherman, Texas, he died at age 70 in Waxahachie, Texas.

External links

1921 births
1992 deaths
Major League Baseball outfielders
Brooklyn Dodgers players
Syracuse Chiefs players
Baseball players from Texas
People from Sherman, Texas
Brownsville Charros players
Lamesa Lobos players
Johnstown Johnnies players
Montreal Royals players
Fort Worth Cats players
Nashville Vols players
Greenville Majors players